A Twenty20 International (T20I) is an international cricket match between two teams that have official ODI status, as determined by the International Cricket Council. It is played under the rules of Twenty20 cricket and is the shortest form of the game. The Scotland national cricket team played its first T20I match on 12 September 2007, against Pakistan as part of the 2007 ICC World Twenty20, losing the match by 51 runs.

This list comprises all members of the Scotland cricket team who have played at least one T20I match. It is initially arranged in the order in which each player won his first Twenty20 cap. Where more than one player won his first Twenty20 cap in the same match, those players are listed alphabetically by surname.

Key

Players
Statistics are correct as of 21 October 2022.

See also
Twenty20 International
Scotland national cricket team
List of Scottish ODI cricketers

References

Scottish Twenty20
Scottish